Kremin is a Ukrainian-language surname literally meaning "flint". Notable people with this surname include: 

Dmytro Kremin (1953-2019),  Ukrainian poet, journalist, translator, and scholar
, Ukrainian schoilar and politician, Language ombudsman

See also

Kremen (disambiguation)

Ukrainian-language surnames